In comics, Bloodstone may refer to:

 The Bloodstone or the Bloodstone Gem, a Marvel Comics fictional mystical gem from which the Bloodstone family in Marvel derive their name.
 Bloodstone (Marvel Cinematic Universe), the Marvel Cinematic Universe (MCU) adaptation
 Bloodstone, a fictional family in Marvel Comics:
 Ulysses Bloodstone, the patriarch of the Bloodstone family who found the Bloodstone
 Ulysses Bloodstone (Marvel Cinematic Universe), the MCU adaptation
 Elsa Bloodstone, his daughter
 Elsa Bloodstone (Marvel Cinematic Universe), the MCU adaptation
 Cullen Bloodstone, his son
 Elise Bloodstone, her mother who appeared in her daughter's eponymous series
 Verussa Bloodstone, a character created for the MCU
 "Hunt for the Bloodstone", a 1989 Captain America storyline where he looks for the Bloodstone and uncovers Ulysses' body. There is also a trade paperback collection of it.
 One of the five pentagonal arranged Bloodstones of the Bloodstone amulet created by Belasco, which was used to open a gateway and release the Elder Gods from their imprisonment

See also 
 Bloodstone (disambiguation)

References